Omphale is an opera by the French composer Jean-Baptiste Cardonne, first performed at the Académie Royale de Musique (the Paris Opera) on 2 May 1769. It takes the form of a tragédie en musique in five acts. The libretto, by Antoine Houdar de La Motte, was originally set by André Cardinal Destouches in 1701.

Sources
 Félix Clément and Pierre Larousse Dictionnaire des Opéras, Paris, 1881

French-language operas
Tragédies en musique
1769 operas
Operas